Jørgen Robert Viggo Hansen (23 March 1911 – 6 August 1991) was a Danish field hockey player who competed in the 1936 Summer Olympics and in the 1948 Summer Olympics.

He was born and died in Kalundborg.

In 1936 he was a member of the Danish team which was eliminated in the group stage of the Olympic tournament. He played both matches as back.

Twelve years later he was eliminated with the Danish team in the first round of the 1948 Olympic tournament. He played all four matches as back.

External links
 
profile

1911 births
1991 deaths
Danish male field hockey players
Olympic field hockey players of Denmark
Field hockey players at the 1936 Summer Olympics
Field hockey players at the 1948 Summer Olympics
People from Kalundborg
Sportspeople from Region Zealand